Dame Mary Elizabeth Stacey,  (born 15 May 1961) is a British High Court judge.

Stacey is the daughter of Rev Nicholas Stacey and was educated at The King's School in Canterbury. She studied English at Keble College, Oxford and graduated with a BA in 1982.

Stacey was admitted as a solicitor in 1987, becoming partner and head of equality at Thompsons in 1993 and serving in that role until 1997. She was part-time chair of the employment tribunals from 1997 to 2003, and full-time chair and latterly an employment judge from 2003 to 2014. She was appointed a recorder in 2007, a circuit judge in 2014, and deputy High Court judge in 2018. She was member of Goldsmiths, University of London council from 2008 to 2014. 

On 1 October 2020, Stacey was appointed a judge of the High Court, replacing Sir Michael Supperstone who retired, and she was assigned to the Queen's Bench Division. She took the customary damehood in the same year. 

In 2004, she married Stuart Bell and together they have two sons.

References 

Living people
1961 births
British women judges
Dames Commander of the Order of the British Empire
Alumni of Keble College, Oxford
Queen's Bench Division judges
British solicitors
People educated at The King's School, Canterbury
21st-century English judges
20th-century English judges